Suryagarha Assembly constituency is one of 243 constituencies of legislative assembly of Bihar. It is part of  Munger Lok Sabha constituency along with other assembly constituencies viz. Jamalpur, Munger and Lakhisarai.

Overview
Suryagarha comprises CD Blocks Pipariya, Suryagarha, Chanan; Gram Panchayats Garhi Bishanpur, Khagaur & Mahisona of Lakshisarai CD Block.

Members of Legislative Assembly

Election results

2020

2015

References

External links
 

Politics of Lakhisarai district
Assembly constituencies of Bihar